= Greek Consulate, Serres =

Greek Consulate of Serres is a former Greek consulate in Serres. It was founded in 1856, when Serres was located in the northwest Ottoman Empire. It ceased operations in 1913, when Greece annexed the city of Serres after the First Balkan War.

The consulate's jurisdiction covered the Serres sanjak, Melnik and Drama. The consulate's activities where focused in promoting Greek-language education and preserving the area's Greeks.
